was a town located in Hata District, Kōchi Prefecture, Japan.

As of 2003, the town had an estimated population of 9,794 and a density of 87.03 persons per km². The total area was 112.54 km².

On March 20, 2006, Ōgata, along with the town of Saga (also from Hata District), was merged to create the town of Kuroshio and no longer exists as an independent municipality.

External links
 Official website of Kuroshio Town 

Dissolved municipalities of Kōchi Prefecture
Kuroshio, Kōchi